Estadio Guillermo Plazas Alcid is a multi-purpose stadium in Neiva, Colombia. It is currently used mostly for football matches. The stadium has a capacity of 22,000 people and was built in 1980. Atlético Huila plays its home matches at this stadium.

The Guillermo Plazas Alcid stadium had a 'handmade' start in the late 1950s, when a group of young people decided to clean a minefield of stones located at that time near the Mano Fuerte district, to give it the shape of soccer field. The organizer was at that time political leader Alfonzo Díaz Parra. This project lasted about a week, and ended up being called "The Desnucadero".

Nevertheless, it was until 1964 thanks to the famous brick march, led by the mayor elect of the time Guillermo Plazas Alcid and his right hand Senator Díaz Parra, in addition in which college students and common citizens participated, that the idea of having a soccer stadium was taking shape. The definitive construction was consolidated thanks to the donation of a piece of land in the La Libertad neighborhood by the Municipal Government for the designation of Neiva as the venue for the 1980 National Sports Games, and the stadium officially opened on 28 November 1980. 

Its first renovation was between 1992 and 1995, which consisted of the creation of the east stand built under the term of governor Luis Enrique Ortiz.

In January 2015, works began on a $20 million renovation project, scheduled for completion by November 2016. However, on 19 August 2016, a fatal accident occurred when a slab of concrete fell, killing four and seriously wounding ten others. After that, construction was halted for almost five years. Construction finally resumed in August 2021, with the project scaled down.

References

Sports venues completed in 1980
Football venues in Colombia
Multi-purpose stadiums in Colombia
Estadio Guillermo Plazas Alcid
Estadio Guillermo Plazas Alcid